Tina Kahniashvili is a Georgian physicist researching theoretical cosmology, cosmic rays, high-energy astronomy, and fluid dynamics. She is a professor of physics and astronomy at Ilia State University and an associate research professor at Carnegie Mellon University.

Education 
Kahniashvili completed a B.S. in physics with high honors and a specialization in theoretical physics at the Tbilisi State University (TSU) in 1983. In 1984, she completed an M.S. in physics education and theoretical physics. Her thesis, Gauge Invariant Theory of Gravitational Perturbations, was supervised by V. N. Lukash.

In 1988, Kahniashvili completed a Ph.D. in physics at the Russian Space Research Institute. Her dissertation was titled, Gravitational Instability in the Universe with Weakly Interacting Particles. Her doctoral advisors were Lukash and Igor Dmitriyevich Novikov. She completed a postdoctoral fellowship at the Astro Space Center in 1999.

Kahniashvili earned a Sc.D. (Habilitation) in physical and mathematical sciences at the Lebedev Physical Institute in 2000. Her dissertation was titled, Cosmic Microwave Background Anisotropies and Large Scale Structure Formation.

Career and research 
From 1988 to 2007, she held various faculty positions culminating as a lead staff scientist at the Abastumani Astrophysical Observatory. She was an associate research professor in the department of physics at Kansas State University from 2005 to 2006. From 2008 to 2010, Kahniashvili was an associate professor in physics at the Ilia State University (ISU). She is a professor of physics and astronomy at ISU and an associate research professor at Carnegie Mellon University.

She researches theoretical cosmology, cosmic rays, high-energy astronomy, and fluid dynamics.

References

External links 

 

Living people
Year of birth missing (living people)
Place of birth missing (living people)
Physicists from Georgia (country)
20th-century physicists
21st-century physicists
20th-century women physicists
21st-century women scientists
Tbilisi State University alumni
Academic staff of Ilia State University
Kansas State University faculty
Carnegie Mellon University faculty